William d'Autremencourt (died 1294) was a Lord of Salona from 1258 to 1294.

Ancestry

He was a son of  Thomas II d'Autremencourt, Lord of Salona, and wife a niece of William II of Villehardouin.

Marriage and issue

The name of William's wife is not known.  William and his wife had two children:

 Agnes, married with Dreux de Beaumont, marshal of Charles I of Naples.
 Thomas, his successor as Lord of Salona.

References

Sources

 
 

1294 deaths
Lords of Salona
Year of birth missing